Oryu station is a railway station on the Jeolla Line in South Korea.

Defunct railway stations in South Korea
Imsil County
Railway stations opened in 1931
Railway stations closed in 2004